The NCAA Division I FBS receiving leaders are career, single-season, and single-game leaders in  receiving yards,  receiving touchdowns and receptions. These lists are dominated by more recent players for several reasons:
 Since 1955, seasons have increased from 10 games to 11 and then 12 games in length.
 The NCAA didn't allow freshmen to play varsity football until 1972 (with the exception of the World War II years), allowing players to have four-year careers.
 Bowl games only began counting toward single-season and career statistics in 2002. This affects many players from before that time period. For example, Trevor Insley had 98 receiving yards in the 1996 Las Vegas Bowl, which would bring his career total to 5,103 if this game counted in his career statistics.

Only seasons in which a team was considered to be a part of the Football Bowl Subdivision are included in these lists. For example, only one of Randy Moss's two seasons at Marshall (1997) is found on these lists.

All records are current as of the end of the 2022 season.

Receiving Yards
The career leader in receiving yards is Western Michigan's Corey Davis. Davis does not have any single seasons in the top 30, instead having a consistent run of 941, 1,408, 1,429, and 1,500 yards over his four seasons. He broke the record set by Trevor Insley at Nevada. Prior to Insley, the record was held by a pair of Wyoming receivers, Ryan Yarborough and then Marcus Harris.

Insley holds the single-season record as the only player to ever catch for more than 2,000 yards in a season. He edged out the record set by Troy Edwards the previous season. Edwards also holds the single-game record for 405. Of particular note is a 1967 game in which two different Tulsa receivers had over 300 yards.

Receiving Touchdowns
The career leader in receiving touchdowns is Rice's Jarett Dillard, who in 2008 broke a 20-year-old record set by Louisiana Tech's Troy Edwards in 1998. Edwards remains third on the list despite only having played for 3 seasons.

Edwards tops the list of single-season touchdowns with 27, while Oklahoma State's Rashaun Woods tops the single-game list with 7.

Receptions
The career leader in receptions is East Carolina's Zay Jones, who broke his former teammate Justin Hardy's record in 2016. The first players to catch at least 300 passes in their careers were Purdue's Taylor Stubblefield and Marshall's Josh Davis, both of whom passed 300 catches in 2004.

Jones also set the single-season record in 2016, passing Bowling Green's Freddie Barnes, who in 2009 broke a 20-year record held by Houston's Manny Hazard.

References

Passing yardage leaders